Kim Tae-hee (born 29 March 1980) is a South Korean actress. Considered one of South Korea's most beautiful actresses, she is best known for her roles in Korean dramas such as Stairway to Heaven (2003), Love Story in Harvard (2004), Iris (2009), My Princess (2011), Yong-pal (2015), and Hi Bye, Mama! (2020). Kim Tae-hee is referred to as one of "The Troika" along with Song Hye-kyo and Jun Ji-hyun, collectively known by the acronym "Tae-Hye-Ji".

Early life and education
Kim Tae-hee was born on 29 March 1980 in Ulsan, South Korea. Her father is Kim Yoo Moon, who established, and is chairman of, Hankook Union Transportation Company in 1984. She is often involved in various charities to help out underserved youths and broken families in the Ulsan area. She has an older sister, Kim Hee-won, and a younger brother, Lee Wan; the latter is also an actor and appeared in her television series Stairway to Heaven. She attended Samshin Elementary School, Daehyun Middle School (대현중학교) and then enrolled at Ulsan Girls' High School.

In 1999, Kim moved to Seoul to attend college at the prestigious Seoul National University, where she became the president of the SNU Women's Ski Club. In 2005, she graduated from SNU with a bachelor's degree in fashion design.

Career

2001–2002: Beginnings
In 2000, an advertising executive saw Kim riding the subway, and offered her a modeling job. Kim appeared in television commercials and print ads, before making her acting debut with a small role in the 2001 melodrama Last Present. In 2002, she starred in the short film Living in New Town and the sitcom Let's Go, followed by Screen and A Problem at My Younger Brother's House in 2003.

2003–2006: Rising popularity and film debut
Kim rose to stardom in 2003 via her portrayal of the evil stepsister in the popular SBS TV series Stairway to Heaven. Starting 2004, Kim was cast in leading roles in her succeeding projects, including the supernatural KBS series Forbidden Love and the SBS campus romance Love Story in Harvard. The latter drew solid viewership ratings nationwide throughout its run with a peak viewer rating of 20 percent and won Kim the Most Popular Actress award in TV category at the Baeksang Arts Awards. Love Story in Harvard was also reportedly well-received by Japanese viewers and contributed to Kim's popularity in the country.

Riding the big success of Stairway to Heaven and Love Story in Harvard, Kim became one of the most sought-after faces in the TV commercial industry. She was picked by Korea Broadcast Advertising Corporation as the top advertising model of the year in 2008, earning her title of "CF Queen". However, Kim expressed her desire to be valued properly as an actor, preferring to succeed based on her acting skills rather than her image.

Kim then turned to film, starring in action fantasy epic The Restless (2006), and the romantic comedy Venus and Mars (2007). However, both were unsuccessful at the box office.

2009–2014: Iris and rising overseas popularity

Back on the small screen in 2009, Kim played an NIS profiler in the spy action thriller Iris. It was one of the most expensive Korean dramas ever produced and was a critical and commercial success with an average viewership rating of 30%. Kim shed tears at the KBS Drama Awards when she won an Excellence Award in a Mid-length Drama; which was her first acting award, excluding newcomer and popularity awards.

Kim left her then-agency Namoo Actors in January 2010 to join Lua Entertainment, which was founded by her brother-in-law. That year, she also played a horse jockey who dreams of winning the championship in the sports film Grand Prix.

After the success of Iris, she again drew positive reviews in the romantic comedy series My Princess (2011); Kim played an ordinary college student who discovers that she is Korean royalty. Later that year, she starred in her first Japanese television drama Boku to Star no 99 Nichi, where her character is a Korean Wave star who meets an ordinary Japanese bodyguard and he somehow makes her fall head over heels in love with him. The Fuji TV drama, which aired in Japan from October to December 2011, raked in 9 to 10 percent of viewers' ratings on average, launching Kim as a household name in Japan. Kim later encountered backlash from some Japanese netizens for allegedly promoting South Korea's claim in the Liancourt Rocks dispute during her 2005 trip to Switzerland as a goodwill ambassador.

In 2013, Kim starred in her first historical drama Jang Ok-jung, Living by Love as the infamous royal concubine Hui-bin Jang. This was followed by another period role, as the wife of famed Chinese calligrapher Wang Xizhi in the Chinese television drama Saint Wang Xizhi.

2015–present: Career resurgence
Kim returned to Korean television in 2015, playing an heiress who recovers from a coma with the help of a doctor-for-hire, the titular Yong-pal. The show garnered strong ratings and Kim won a Top Excellence Acting award from the Korea Drama Awards.

In 2020, Kim returned to television in the family drama series Hi Bye, Mama!.

Personal life 
In September 2012, Kim started dating South Korean singer-actor Rain. They married on 19 January 2017.

On 23 May 2017, Kim's agency, Lua Entertainment, announced that Kim was pregnant with their first child. She gave birth to a daughter on 25 October 2017. In February 2019, Kim announced she was pregnant again. On 19 September 2019, she gave birth to the couple's second daughter.

Kim is a practicing Catholic. She was one of 30 Catholic celebrities who appeared in the 2014 music video for the digital single "Koinonia" to commemorate Pope Francis's visit to South Korea, the first time in 19 years that an incumbent pope visited South Korea. Her baptismal name is Verda.

Philanthropy 
In May 2022, Kim donated 200 million won to help neighbors affected by forest fires in Uljin, Gyeongbuk and Samcheok, Gangwon through the Hope Bridge National Disaster Mitigation Association.

On July 22, 2022, Kim donated 1.1 million KF94 masks and face masks to NGO G-Foundation.

Filmography

Film

Television series

Music video appearances

Awards and nominations

Listicles

References

External links

 Kim Tae-hee blog at Naver 
 Kim Tae-hee fan cafe at Daum 
  
 Kim Tae-hee Japanese website 
 
 
 

South Korean film actresses
South Korean television actresses
South Korean female models
Seoul National University alumni
South Korean Roman Catholics
People from Busan
1980 births
Living people